Out of My Head and Back in My Bed is the thirtieth solo studio album by American country music singer-songwriter Loretta Lynn. It was released on February 13, 1978, by MCA Records.

Commercial performance 
The album peaked at No. 16 on the Billboard Top Country Albums chart. The album's first single, "Out of My Head and Back in My Bed", peaked at No. 1 on the Billboard Hot Country Songs chart, Lynn's eleventh solo single to top the chart. The second single, "Spring Fever", peaked at No. 12.

Recording 
Recording sessions for the album took place at Bradley's Barn in Mount Juliet, TN. There were no sessions held specifically for this album. The earliest recording featured on the album, "His Lovin' Told Me He Was Gone", was recorded on June 12, 1975, during a session for 1976's When the Tingle Becomes a Chill. "Out of My Head and Back in My Bed" was recorded during the June 28, 1976 session for 1976's Somebody Somewhere. Six songs on the album were recorded during sessions for 1977's I Remember Patsy: "Old Rooster" on September 28, 1976; "Spring Fever", "The Dead Is a Risin'", "Black-Eyed Peas and Blue-Eyed Babies" and "God Bless the Children" on December 1, 1976; and "Three Riddles" on December 10, 1976. "You Snap Your Fingers (And I'm Back in Your Hands)" and "I'm Gonna Do Somebody Right' were the first songs released from the September 29, 1976 session.

Track listing

Chart positions 
Album – Billboard (North America)

Singles – Billboard (North America)

Personnel 
Owen Bradley – producer
Joe Mills – engineer
Bobby Bradley – engineer
Bud Gray – photographer
Larry Boden – mastering engineer
The Jordanaires – backing vocals
The Nashville Sounds – backing vocals

References 

1978 albums
Loretta Lynn albums
MCA Records albums